Ararat (Djabwurrung: Tallarambooroo) is a city in south-west Victoria, Australia, about  west of Melbourne, on the Western Highway on the eastern slopes of the Ararat Hills and Cemetery Creek valley between Victoria's Western District and the Wimmera. Its urban population according to 2021 census is 8,500 and services the region of 11,880 residents across the Rural City's boundaries. It is also the home of the 2018/19 GMGA Golf Championship Final.

It is the largest settlement in the Rural City of Ararat local government area and is the administrative centre.

The discovery of gold in 1857 during the Victorian gold rush transformed it into a boomtown which continued to prosper until the turn of the 20th century, after which it has steadily declined in population. It was proclaimed as a city on 24 May 1950. After a decline in population over the 1980s and 90s, there has been a small but steady increase in the population, and it is the site of many existing and future, large infrastructure projects, including the Hopkins Correctional Facility development project.

It is named after Mount Ararat 10 kilometres south-west of the town which was named by politician/pastoralist Horatio Wills in 1841.

Ararat is the only city in Australia to be founded by Chinese people.

History 
 

Prior to the European settlement of Australia, Ararat was inhabited by the Djab wurrung group of Aboriginal Australian people. The area encompassing Ararat has many Djabwurrung language placenames; 'Karangajaruk' refers to 'the valley in which Cathcart and the Ararat (gold) diggings lie', 'Warrayatkin' refers to Green Hill Lake, 'Butingitch' refers to the Ararat town site, 'Gorambeep barak' refers to Mount Ararat, and 'Pandort' refers to a large waterhole to the south.

Europeans first settled in the Grampians region in the 1840s after surveyor Thomas Mitchell passed through the area in 1836. In 1841, Horatio Wills, on his way to selecting country further south, wrote in his diary, "like the Ark we rested" and named a nearby hill Mt Ararat. It is from this entry and the nearby Mount that the town takes its name. The post office opened 1 February 1856 although known as Cathcart until 31 August 1857.

In 1857, a party of Chinese miners en route to the Central Victorian gold fields struck gold at the Canton Lead which marked the beginning of great growth in Ararat. The Chinese community was substantial in Ararat, and the Gum San Chinese Heritage Centre commemorates the history of the community.

Rapid growth brought about a municipality, which was incorporated as a borough on 24 September 1858.

Ararat became a city of asylums, with a large facility Aradale Mental Hospital was opened in 1865 and J Ward, a lunatic asylum for criminally insane (formerly the Ararat County Gaol), opened in 1887. Both have been closed but remain as significant reminders of the city's role in the treatment of mentally ill patients.

Vines were planted in 1863 by Swiss settlers, the Pola family.

Traditional ownership claims

The formally recognised traditional owners for the area in which Ararat sits, north-west of Campbell Street and the Pyrenees Highway and north-east of the Western Highway and Lambert Street are the Wotjobaluk, Jardwadjali (also known as Jaadwa), Wergaia and Jupagalk nations. These nations are represented by the Barengi Gadjin Land Council Aboriginal Corporation.

The formally recognised traditional owners for the area in which Ararat sits, south-east of Campbell Street and the Pyrenees Highway are the Djab Wurrung people. The Djab Wurrung people are represented by Martang Pty Ltd.

In the area of Ararat that is south-west of the Western Highway and Lambert Street, traditional owners have not yet been formally recognised. However, the Eastern Maar people are negotiating a recognition and settlement agreement with the Victorian Government. The boundary of the agreement is under negotiation. The Eastern Maar people are represented by the Eastern Maar Aboriginal Corporation (EMAC).

Economy
Ararat's economy is driven by primary industries of the region including wool, beef and the Grampians Wine Region. The region has a number of wind farms including the Challicum Hills Wind Farm produce large amounts of renewable energy to the National Electricity Market. It is also home to AF Gason Pty Ltd one of Australia's largest manufacturers of farm machinery and wood heating.

The city also has a significant service economy with health, community services and is a regional commerce centre. Hopkins Correctional Centre, formerly known as H.M. Prison Ararat, is located on the town's eastern outskirts.

Servicing visitors to the Grampians National Park and the local wine industry, tourism is a relatively small but significant industry in Ararat, employing 150 people and generating around $8 million to the economy, however its impact on the surrounding region is significant with tourists spending $270 million annually. Key tourist attractions include the Ararat Regional Art Gallery, Mount Langi Ghiran winery, tours through Aradale (Australia's largest abandoned 1800s lunatic asylum) and the Gum San Chinese Heritage Centre.

Geography

Ararat is nestled between several mountain ranges, including the Grampians National Park, Mount Langi Ghiran, Mount Cole, Mount Buangor, Ararat Hills Regional Park and the Pyrenees Ranges. Cemetery Creek, the valley's main catchment runs through the north of the town while Green Hill lake is on the city's eastern fringe.

Climate

Demographics
88% of people in Ararat were born in Australia.

62% of people in Ararat identify as Christian. Anglican and Catholic faiths are evenly represented with 18% of people identifying with each.

Governance

The city is the location of the municipal offices and seat of government for the Rural City of Ararat local government area. Ararat is represented by the federal Division of Wannon.

For law enforcement, Ararat has a single police station as well as a magistrates court and a children's court all located on Barkly Street.

Education

Ararat has four primary schools - Ararat Primary (colloquially known as "Ararat 800" by locals); Ararat West Primary; Ararat North Primary and St Mary's Catholic Primary School. In addition there are several kindergartens in the city. There are two main secondary colleges, Ararat College and Marian College, the latter of which is a Catholic secondary school. Ararat has regional campuses of the Federation University Australia (formerly the University of Ballarat) and Melbourne Polytechnic (formerly the Northern Melbourne Institute of TAFE).

Culture

Art 

Ararat's National Trust listed former town hall with its elaborate clock tower, designed by Molloy and Smith and built in 1899, is now home to the Ararat Regional Art Gallery, and the Ararat Performing Arts Centre for the city.

Sport 
Australian rules football is a popular sport in Ararat. The Ararat Football Club (formed in 1871) was a founding club of the Wimmera Football League and continues to compete with its most recent premiership in 2001. A second club, the Ararat Eagles Football Club was formed more recently in 2000 to play in the Lexton Plains Football League, but now play in the Mininera & District Football League. Like many country football clubs, Ararat's clubs offer netball as a popular sport for women in Ararat, with the Ararat Rats representing the city in the Wimmera Netball Association.

The horse racing club, the Wimmera Racing Club, schedules around five race meetings a year at Ararat including the Ararat Cup meeting in November.

Ararat Harness Racing Club conducts regular meetings at its racetrack in the town.

Golfers play at the Aradale Golf Club on Grano Street or at the course of the Chalambar Golf Club on Golf Links Road.

Motocross has become a popular sport in the area, and the Ararat Motorcycle Club regularly holds events up to state level.

Association Football is played at junior level, with the Ararat and Grampians YMCA school competition from years 8–12.

Festivals 
The city's main community festival is known as the Golden Gateway Festival and has run since 1958 when it was set up to commemorate the city's centenary.

The Jailhouse Rock Festival (since 1994 a retro 1950s themed festival) is the other major festival event in Ararat.

In popular culture 
Two Royal Australian Navy ships have been named after this town.

In 2014 Ararat residents appeared in the Channel 10 hit show The Biggest Loser.

Ararat was the setting for the 2008 film Lake Mungo.

Attractions 
Popular tourist destinations include the Gum San Chinese Heritage Centre, Aradale Lunatic Asylum Tours, Langi Morgala Museum, The Astor Cinema, and J Ward. Guests can attend a day time history tour of J Ward or be incarcerated for an evening on the J Ward Ghost Tour.

Infrastructure

Transport 

The main form of transport is road transport and motor vehicles. According to the 2006 Census, 88% of people traveled to work by motor vehicle, the vast majority of which traveled by automobile. Ararat is situated at the junction of several main roads including the Western Highway via High Street (running eastward to Ballarat and Melbourne and westward to Horsham and Adelaide); the Pyrenees Highway via Vincent Street (running east to Avoca and Maryborough); Ararat-Pomonal Road via Barkly Street (westward towards Halls Gap) and the Mortlake-Ararat Road via Vincent Street (running south with connections to the west and Hamilton, south and Warrnambool and to the east and Geelong). Ararat's urban area streets are laid out in grid plan. Roads are also important for public transport. Ararat Transit provides 120 bus services on three routes 6 days a week, connecting with train services. According to the 2006 Census, just 4 persons in Ararat traveled to work by bus. Taxi services are provided by Ararat Cabs (since November 2010), provides 6 normal taxi-cabs and 1 wheel-chair bus, capable of 2 wheelchairs or 10 standard passengers.

Rail transport includes both passenger rail and freight rail. The city's only station is Ararat's railway station which is on the Ararat railway line and is the terminal train station for the Ararat V/Line rail service. Twice daily peak VLocity services run to Ballarat (53 minutes) and on to Melbourne (133–143 minutes), with some trains stopping at stations in between. The rail station is at the junction of the Ararat line, the Western standard gauge railway and Avoca railway. The Overland runs to Melbourne twice weekly (140 minutes) and travel to Adelaide is also possible (8 hours).

A regional airport, Ararat Airport YARA (ARY) is located 5 km south of the city on the Western Highway and provides for general aviation.

Health 

Ararat & District Hospital (established in 1850) is a major regional hospital and is coordinated by the East Grampians Health Service and Ararat Medical Centre.

Utilities 
Water and waste-water services are supplied by Grampians-Wimmera-Mallee Water (GWMWater). Ararat's water supply source is a combination of Mt Cole Reservoir and Lake Fyans, with the smaller Langi Ghiran (Picnic Road) Reservoir also part of the water supply system. Olivers Gully and Copes Hill reservoirs provide additional water storage.

Notable people
 Shane KellyOlympic cyclist and silver and bronze medallist
 Rene KinkAustralian Rules footballer
 Neil MurrayArarat-born, Lake Bolac-raised singer-songwriter
 Air Chief Marshal Sir Frederick Schergerborn in Ararat on 18 May 1904
 James Scobie (1860–1940)jockey and racehorse trainer, was born in or near Ararat
Geoff Toddartist

References

External links 

Ararat Online
History of Ararat

 
1857 establishments in Australia
Western District (Victoria)
Populated places established in 1857
Mining towns in Victoria (Australia)